Justin Lee (born September 26, 1989) is an American actor known for his role as Annyong (Hel-loh) Bluth in the Netflix sitcom Arrested Development.

Early life
Justin Lee, the middle child of three siblings, was born in Los Angeles, California on September 30, 1989, of Korean descent. Lee attended Tesoro High School in Las Flores, California, and graduated from Sunny Hills High School in 2007.

Career
Lee began his career in 2004 as Hel-loh "Annyong" Bluth, the adopted Korean son of Lucille and George Bluth in the Fox sitcom Arrested Development.

In 2007, Lee played the role of Todd in the Wendelin Van Draanen-based made-for-TV movie Shredderman Rules. Lee appeared in the independent film Just Peck which premiered at the Cannes Film Festival in 2009. He also had a recurring role on the ABC Family television series 10 Things I Hate About You, portraying Charlie "The Perv" Woo.

Filmography

Film

Television

References

External links

American male child actors
American male film actors
21st-century American male actors
1989 births
Living people
American male actors of Korean descent
Male actors from Los Angeles
American male television actors